Gnathostomulidae is a family of worms belonging to the order Bursovaginoidea.

Genera:
 Chirognathia Sterrer & Sørensen, 2006
 Corculognathia Ehlers & Ehlers, 1973
 Gnathostomula Ax, 1956
 Ratugnathia Sterrer, 1991
 Semaeognathia Riedl, 1970

References

Gnathostomulida
Platyzoa families